Cigánd is a very small town in Borsod-Abaúj-Zemplén county, Northern Hungary,  from the county capital Miskolc.

History
The area has been inhabited since ancient times . Before the Hungarians conquered the area, Slavic and Avar tribes lived here.

Cigánd was first mentioned in documents in 1289. Its residents were fishers, hunters and serfs. In 1347 the village was divided into two parts because of a debate over ownership, the two parts were called Small Cigánd and Greater Cigánd. The two parts were reunited in 1922.

After the regulation of the Tisza river, the village got arable land, and from this time the residents grew potatoes.

Cigánd was granted town status on 1 July 2004.

International relations

Twin towns – Sister cities
Cigánd is twinned with:

  Aluniș, Romania  
  Biel, Slovakia
  Sobrance, Slovakia

References

External links

  in Hungarian

Populated places in Borsod-Abaúj-Zemplén County
Romani communities in Hungary